Anthony Joseph Dimond (November 30, 1881 – May 28, 1953) was an American Democratic Party politician who was the Alaska Territory Delegate in the United States House of Representatives from 1933 to 1945. Dimond was also an early champion of Alaska statehood.

Early life
Dimond, known as "Tony," was born in Palatine Bridge, Montgomery County, New York and attended Catholic schools, taught school in Montgomery County (1900–1903), and was a prospector/miner in Alaska (1905–1912) before studying law and beginning practice in Valdez (1913).

Political career

Dimond's political experience includes: US Commissioner in Chisana, Alaska (1913–1914); Special Assistant US Attorney for the 3rd Judicial Division of Alaska in Valdez (1917); Mayor of Valdez (1920–1922, 1925–1932); Alaska Territorial Senate (1923–1926, 1929–1932); and District Judge for the 3rd Division of Alaska (1945–1953). He also served as a Delegate to the Democratic National Convention in 1936 and 1940. He died on May 28, 1953, in Anchorage.

A Roman Catholic, Dimond was a member of organizations such as the Elks, Moose and Eagles.

Mentees' careers 
His secretary from 1933-1934, Bob Bartlett, eventually became a United States senator from Alaska, serving from 1959-1968. His godson, Bill Egan, became Alaska's first Governor after Statehood, serving from 1959-1966 & 1970-1974. His son, John H. Dimond, became a Justice of the Alaska Supreme Court following statehood.

Legacy 
Today, November 30 is celebrated by the State of Alaska as "Anthony Dimond Day." In Anchorage, A. J. Dimond High School and Dimond Boulevard, a major thoroughfare, are named after him.

Slattery Report 
In 1940, when President Franklin D. Roosevelt was considering making Alaska an international Jewish homeland, Dimond was the main force behind defeating the effort.

See also
 Dimond Center;  like Dimond High School, its name derives from its proximity to Dimond Boulevard
 The Yiddish Policemen's Union, a 2007 alternate history novel by Michael Chabon whose divergence point from actual history is the early death of Dimond due to a car accident.

References

External links
 
 
 Anthony Dimond at 100 Years of Alaska's Legislature

1881 births
1953 deaths
Alaska Territory judges
Delegates to the United States House of Representatives from Alaska Territory
Democratic Party members of the United States House of Representatives from Alaska
Mayors of Valdez, Alaska
Members of the Alaska Territorial Legislature
Politicians from Anchorage, Alaska
People from Palatine Bridge, New York
20th-century American politicians
20th-century American judges